Jaden McDaniels (born September 29, 2000) is an American professional basketball player for the Minnesota Timberwolves of the National Basketball Association (NBA). He played college basketball for the Washington Huskies. He attended Federal Way High School in Federal Way, Washington, where he was named a McDonald's All-American and Washington Gatorade Player of the Year as a senior. McDaniels was a five-star recruit and one of the top players in the 2019 class.

High school career
McDaniels played basketball for Federal Way High School in Federal Way, Washington. As a freshman, he was teammates with his older brother Jalen and helped Federal Way win its second straight Class 4A state championship. McDaniels averaged 2.4 points and 1.8 rebounds per game on the varsity team and was forced to shoot with his left hand due to a right elbow injury. In his first two years, he helped his team win 63 consecutive games, the longest win streak in state history since 1977.

As a junior, McDaniels guided Federal Way to a runner-up finish at the 4A state tournament. In the season, he averaged 21.3 points, 10 rebounds, 4.6 assists, and 3.3 blocks per game and earned USA Today All-USA Washington first team honors. In May 2018, McDaniels saw breakout success at the Nike Elite Youth Basketball League (EYBL) with Seattle Rotary, bolstering his position as a top recruit in the 2019 class.

On January 25, 2019, as a senior, he recorded 51 points against Todd Beamer High School, breaking the school single-game scoring record held by NBA player Donny Marshall. McDaniels averaged 23.3 points, 10 rebounds, four assists and two blocks per game in his senior season, leading his team to third place at the 4A state tournament. He earned Class 4A Player of the Year and Washington Gatorade Player of the Year recognition. McDaniels played in the McDonald's All-American Game and Jordan Brand Classic.

Recruiting
By the end of his high school career, McDaniels was considered a consensus five-star recruit and the best power forward in the 2019 class. ESPN and Rivals ranked him among the top 10 players in his class. On May 22, 2019, McDaniels committed to play college basketball for Washington. He had also received strong interest from Kentucky during the recruiting process.

College career

Heading in to the college season McDaniels was considered a possible number one pick for the 2020 NBA draft . In his collegiate debut, a 67–64 upset of Baylor, McDaniels had 18 points and seven rebounds. He had a season-high 22 points against Ball State. As a freshman, McDaniels averaged 13 points and 5.8 rebounds per game while starting 21 games but he began coming off the bench midway through conference play. Following the season, he declared for the 2020 NBA draft.

Professional career

Minnesota Timberwolves (2020–present)

In the 2020 NBA draft, he was selected by the Los Angeles Lakers in the first round with the 28th overall selection. He was then traded to the Oklahoma City Thunder along with Danny Green for Dennis Schröder and later traded to the Minnesota Timberwolves, along with the draft rights of Immanuel Quickley, in exchange for Aleksej Pokuševski.

Career statistics

NBA

Regular season

|-
| style="text-align:left;"| 
| style="text-align:left;"| Minnesota
| 63 || 27 || 24.0 || .447 || .364 || .600 || 3.7 || 1.1 || .6 || 1.0 || 6.8
|-
| style="text-align:left;"| 
| style="text-align:left;"| Minnesota
| 70 || 31 || 25.8 || .460 || .317 || .803 || 4.2 || 1.1 || .7 || .8 || 9.2
|- class="sortbottom"
| style="text-align:center;" colspan="2"|Career
| 133 || 58 || 24.9 || .455 || .338 || .724 || 3.9 || 1.1 || .7 || .9 || 8.1

Playoffs

|-
| style="text-align:left;"| 2022
| style="text-align:left;"| Minnesota
| 6 || 0 || 21.7 || .529 || .500 || .833 || 2.8 || .7 || .3 || 1.8 || 9.3
|- class="sortbottom"
| style="text-align:center;" colspan="2"| Career
| 6 || 0 || 21.7 || .529 || .500 || .833 || 2.8 || .7 || .3 || 1.8 || 9.3

College

|-
| style="text-align:left;"| 2019–20
| style="text-align:left;"| Washington
| 31 || 21 || 31.1 || .405 || .339 || .763 || 5.8 || 2.1 || .8 || 1.4 || 13.0
|- class="sortbottom"
| style="text-align:center;" colspan="2"|Career
| 31 || 21 || 31.1 || .405 || .339 || .763 || 5.8 || 2.1 || .8 || 1.4 || 13.0

Personal life
McDaniels' older brother, Jalen McDaniels, played basketball for Federal Way High School, where he was a four-star recruit, before joining San Diego State at the college level. He was selected by the Charlotte Hornets in the second round of the 2019 NBA draft. McDaniels is a cousin of former NBA player Juwan Howard. Both his father, Will McDaniels, and his mother, Angela Jackson, are originally from Chicago.

References

External links
Washington Huskies bio
USA Basketball bio

2000 births
Living people
African-American basketball players
American men's basketball players
Basketball players from Washington (state)
Los Angeles Lakers draft picks
McDonald's High School All-Americans
Minnesota Timberwolves players
People from Federal Way, Washington
Power forwards (basketball)
Sportspeople from King County, Washington
Washington Huskies men's basketball players
21st-century African-American sportspeople
20th-century African-American sportspeople